Alyaksandr Mikalaevich Kulchy (born 1 November 1973) is a Belarusian football manager and a former player. He is the manager of Dynamo-2 Moscow. He is the all-time most capped player for the Belarus national team.

International career
Kulchy earned his 100th cap for the Belarus national team on 7 June 2012, in a 1–1 friendly draw with Lithuania.

Coaching career
On 29 September 2020, he was assigned caretaker manager of Dynamo Moscow following the resignation of Kirill Novikov. Dynamo won the only game against FC Krasnodar that he managed before Sandro Schwarz was appointed permanent manager on 14 October.

Career statistics

Club

International
Scores and results list Belarus' goal tally first, score column indicates score after each Kulchy goal.

Honours
MPKC Mozyr
Belarusian Premier League: 1996
Belarusian Cup: 1995–96

Individual
Belarusian Footballer of the Year: 2009

See also
 List of men's footballers with 100 or more international caps

References

External links
 
 Profile 
 
 

Living people
1973 births
Sportspeople from Gomel
Soviet footballers
Belarusian footballers
Association football midfielders
Belarus international footballers
FIFA Century Club
Belarusian Premier League players
Russian Premier League players
Kazakhstan Premier League players
FC Gomel players
FC Slavia Mozyr players
FC Fandok Bobruisk players
FC Dynamo Moscow players
FC Shinnik Yaroslavl players
FC Tom Tomsk players
FC Rostov players
FC Krasnodar players
FC Sibir Novosibirsk players
FC Irtysh Pavlodar players
Belarusian football managers
Russian Premier League managers
FC Gomel managers
FC Dynamo Moscow managers
Belarusian expatriate footballers
Belarusian expatriate football managers
Belarusian expatriate sportspeople in Russia
Expatriate footballers in Russia
Expatriate football managers in Russia
Belarusian expatriate sportspeople in Kazakhstan
Expatriate footballers in Kazakhstan